North West Eagles is a South African professional basketball team located in Potchefstroom, North West Province of South Africa. The team competes in the Basketball National League.

Notable players
To appear in this section a player must have either:
- Set a club record or won an individual award as a professional player.
- Played at least one official international match for his senior national team or one NBA game at any time.
 Phemza The Kween
 Masego Loate

References

External links
Presentation at Afrobasket.com
Presentation at facebook

Basketball teams in South Africa
Basketball teams established in 1993
Sport in North West (South African province)
Potchefstroom